Ørnulf is a Norwegian given name that may refer to
Ørnulf Andresen (born 1944), Norwegian cyclist
Ørnulf Bast (1907–1974), Norwegian sculptor and painter 
Ørnulf Dahl (1900–1971), Norwegian military officer
Ørnulf Egge (1910–1978), Norwegian politician 
Ørnulf Gulbransen (1916–2004), Norwegian flute player
Ørnulf Opdahl (born 1944), Norwegian painter and educator
Ørnulf Ranheimsæter (1919–2007), Norwegian illustrator, graphical artist and essayist
Ørnulf Rød (1891–1969), Norwegian barrister
Ørnulf Seippel (born 1962), Norwegian sociologist
Ørnulf Tofte (born 1922), Norwegian police officer

See also
IF Ørnulf, Norwegian sports club

Norwegian masculine given names